The Masonic Temple is a historic Masonic Temple located at Chambersburg in Franklin County, Pennsylvania. It was built in 1823–1824, and is a two-story, brick building with a stucco veneer applied in 1905.  An addition was built in 1966.

It was listed on the National Register of Historic Places in 1976.  It is included in the Chambersburg Historic District.

References

Clubhouses on the National Register of Historic Places in Pennsylvania
Masonic buildings completed in 1824
Buildings and structures in Franklin County, Pennsylvania
Chambersburg
National Register of Historic Places in Franklin County, Pennsylvania
Individually listed contributing properties to historic districts on the National Register in Pennsylvania